Tim Mack may refer to:

 Timothy Mack, American pole vaulter
 Tim Mack (bowler), American ten-pin bowler